The Wukou Village Liou Family Ancestral Hall is an ancestral shrine in Wanluan Township, Pingtung County, Taiwan.

Architecture
The Hakka-style hall spans over an area of 1 hectare. It was built with two internal wings, two external wings and Baroque-style walls. Most of the building material were brought from Guangdong. There are two lion stones placed in front of the main entrance.

See also
 Chinese ancestral veneration
 Chaolin Temple
 Donglong Temple
 Checheng Fuan Temple
 Three Mountains King Temple
 List of temples in Taiwan
 List of tourist attractions in Taiwan

References

1864 establishments in Taiwan
Ancestral shrines in Taiwan
Buildings and structures in Pingtung County
Religious buildings and structures completed in 1864